Morgantown is a neighborhood of Burlington in central Alamance County, North Carolina, United States. It is located on North Carolina Highway 62, south of Glencoe.

Notable people
Alex Gibbs, American football coach.

References

Geography of Alamance County, North Carolina
Neighborhoods in North Carolina
Burlington, North Carolina